Lukač is a village and municipality in Slavonia, in the Virovitica-Podravina County of Croatia. As of the 2001 census, it has a population of 4,276, 92% of which are Croats.

History
In the late 19th and early 20th century, Lukač was part of the Virovitica County of the Kingdom of Croatia-Slavonia.

Municipalities of Croatia
Populated places in Virovitica-Podravina County
Slavonia